Cecil Rodney Young (22 July 1925 — 18 March 1991) was an English footballer who played as a right half.

Career
In 1948, Young signed for hometown club Bournemouth & Boscombe Athletic after being signed to Southampton as an amateur. Over the course of two years, Young made 18 Football League appearances for Bournemouth & Boscombe. Following his time at Bournemouth & Boscombe, Young signed for Chelmsford City.

References

1925 births
1991 deaths
Association football wingers
English footballers
Footballers from Bournemouth
Southampton F.C. players
AFC Bournemouth players
Chelmsford City F.C. players
English Football League players